Linda Heitmann (born 2 August 1982) is a German politician of the Alliance 90/The Greens who has been serving as a member of the Bundestag since the 2021 German federal election, representing the constituency of Hamburg-Altona.

Political career 
In parliament, Heitmann has been serving on the Health Committee and the Committee on the Environment, Nature Conservation, Nuclear Safety, and Consumer Protection since 2022.

Other activities 
 Federal Network Agency for Electricity, Gas, Telecommunications, Post and Railway (BNetzA), Alternate Member of the Advisory Board (since 2022)
 German Foundation for Consumer Protection (DSV), Member of the Board of Trustees (since 2022)

References 

Living people
1982 births
Politicians from Hamburg
21st-century German politicians
21st-century German women politicians
Members of the Bundestag for Alliance 90/The Greens
Members of the Bundestag 2021–2025
Female members of the Bundestag